Marlow Bridge is a road traffic and foot bridge over the River Thames in England between the town of Marlow, Buckinghamshire and the village of Bisham in Berkshire. It crosses the Thames just upstream of Marlow Lock, on the reach to Temple Lock. The bridge is a Grade I listed building.

There has been a bridge on the site since the reign of King Edward III which was stated in around 1530 to have been of timber, though an original crossing to the Knights Templar of Bisham may date from 1309. In 1642 this bridge was partly destroyed by a Parliamentarian army. In 1789 a new timber bridge was built by public subscription with a contribution from the Thames Navigation Commission to increase the headroom underneath. The current suspension bridge was designed by William Tierney Clark and was built between 1829 and 1832, replacing a wooden bridge further downstream which collapsed in 1828.  The Széchenyi Chain Bridge, spanning the River Danube in Budapest, was also designed by William Tierney Clark and it is a larger scale version of Marlow bridge.

In 1965, the bridge was restored. It has a 3 tonne weight restriction and is used only by foot and local road traffic. Other traffic is carried by the Marlow By-pass Bridge. On 24 September 2016, a 37-tonne Lithuanian haulage lorry attempted to pass over the bridge, requiring it to be closed for two months to allow Buckinghamshire County Council to undertake a series of stress tests on the suspension bridge hangers and pins, together with  ultrasound and magnetic particle tests. No significant damage to the bridge was found, and it was reopened on Friday 25 November following restoration of sections exposed for weld testing with three coats of paint, removal of scaffolding surrounding the bridge's two towers, and reinstatement of timber work removed for inspection.

See also
Crossings of the River Thames
Széchenyi Chain Bridge

References

External links

 

Bridges in Berkshire
Bridges in Buckinghamshire
Bridges completed in 1832
Bridges across the River Thames
Grade I listed bridges
Grade I listed buildings in Berkshire
Road bridges in England
Suspension bridges in the United Kingdom
Grade I listed buildings in Buckinghamshire
Marlow, Buckinghamshire
Bisham